"Purple Rain" is a song by American musician Prince and his backing band the Revolution. It is the title track from the 1984 album of the same name, which in turn is the soundtrack album for the 1984 film of the same name starring Prince, and was released as the third single from the album. The song is a power ballad that combines rock, R&B, gospel, and orchestral music.

"Purple Rain" reached number two on the US Billboard Hot 100 and stayed there for two weeks, being kept off the top spot by "Wake Me Up Before You Go-Go" by Wham! It reached the summit in Belgium and the Netherlands. It is certified Gold by the Recording Industry Association of America (RIAA) and is considered to be one of Prince's signature songs. Following Prince's death in 2016, "Purple Rain" re-entered the Billboard Hot 100, where it reached number four. It also re-entered the UK Singles Chart at number six, placing two spaces higher than its original peak. In France, where it originally peaked at number 12, "Purple Rain" reached number one around a week after Prince's death.

"Purple Rain" is ranked at number 18 on Rolling Stone list of the 500 Greatest Songs of All Time and is included in the Rock and Roll Hall of Fame's 500 Songs that Shaped Rock and Roll. During the Super Bowl XLI halftime show in 2007, for which Prince was the featured performer, "Purple Rain" was the last song of his set; the event became especially notable when actual rain fell during the performance while the stage and stadium were lit up with purple lights, and the show continues to top lists of the best Super Bowl halftime shows of all time. Prince performed the song as the opening of a medley of his hits with Beyoncé at the 2004 Grammy Awards. It was also the final song he performed live, taking place at the end of his final performance in Atlanta on April 14, 2016, one week before he died.

Composition

Origins
"Purple Rain" was originally written as a country song and intended to be a collaboration with Stevie Nicks.  According to Nicks, she received a 10-minute instrumental version of the song from Prince with a request to write the lyrics, but felt overwhelmed. She said: "I listened to it and I just got scared. I called him back and said, 'I can't do it. I wish I could. It's too much for me.'" At a rehearsal, Prince then asked his backing band to try the song: "I want to try something before we go home. It's mellow." According to Lisa Coleman, Prince then changed the song after Wendy Melvoin started playing guitar chords to accompany the song: "He was excited to hear it voiced differently. It took it out of that country feeling. Then we all started playing it a bit harder and taking it more seriously. We played it for six hours straight and by the end of that day we had it mostly written and arranged."

Prince's explanation of meaning
Prince explained the meaning of the song as follows: "When there's blood in the sky... red and blue = purple. Purple rain pertains to the end of the world and being with the one you love and letting your faith/God guide you through the purple rain." The title track of Prince's preceding album, 1999, included similar references to a doomed ending under a purple sky ("...could have sworn it was Judgment Day, the sky was all purple..."). The name for the song originates from the 1972 song "Ventura Highway" by the band America.

Song structure
"Purple Rain" is written in the key of B-flat major, opens with a lone guitar quickly followed by live drumming and a prominent Yamaha CP70 Electric grand piano, evoking images of church gospel music. Three verses are each followed by a chorus, with a building emotional delivery. In the context of the film, each verse ties into a different strained relationship Prince's character has and his desire to reconcile.  The song is dedicated to his father in the movie, not ex-girlfriend Denise Matthews better known as Vanity. After the final chorus, a guitar solo takes over the song. The song ends with a piano solo and orchestral strings. Prince's vocal range spans from the low note of B2 to the high note of C6.

Recording
The song was recorded during a benefit concert for the Minnesota Dance Theatre at the First Avenue nightclub in Minneapolis on August 3, 1983. The performance was guitarist Wendy Melvoin's live debut with the Revolution, at the age of 19. City Pages described the 70-minute performance as Prince's "sweatiest and most soulful hometown concert yet", and drummer Bobby Z stated, "it certainly was one of the best concerts we ever did".

The concert was recorded by David Rivkin (also known as David Z, brother of Bobby Z) using a mobile recording unit brought in from the Record Plant in New York City, staffed by engineers Dave Hewitt and Koster McAllister.  David's older brother Cliff Rifkin was the regional promotion executive for Warners in Minneapolis, who also expedited Prince's label signing. David Z's younger brother, Bobby Z, would then become Prince's drummer in the Revolution. David Z was not surprised when he was requested to set up the live recording on August 3, 1983, "With Prince, you never knew," he declared. "I thought we were recording a concert, but I wasn't sure if it was going to be a record, too. I knew they were working on the movie as, as well. You just had to go in prepared to record whatever it was going to be as well as you could." The basic tracks for three songs were used on the Purple Rain soundtrack: "Purple Rain", "I Would Die 4 U", and "Baby I'm a Star". Prince performed overdubs while working at Sunset Sound in Los Angeles from August to September 1983. A solo and a verse from the original recording were edited out, changing the length from eleven to eight minutes. The extra verse was about money but was removed because it diluted the emotional impact of the song.

After recording the song, Prince phoned Jonathan Cain from Journey to ask him to listen to it, as he was worried that it might be too similar to "Faithfully", a Journey single composed by Cain which had recently been in the charts. Cain reassured Prince by telling him that the songs only shared the same four chords. Lisa Coleman created the string arrangement, played by her brother and friends, that was overdubbed into the song in a studio in Los Angeles.

Performances
The song was a staple of Prince's live performances. He played it on nearly every tour after 1984, except for a period after his name change when he avoided his older hits for a few years.

At the Super Bowl XLI halftime show, in which he was the featured performer, "Purple Rain" was featured as the last song of Prince's set and was, appropriately, played during a downpour at the stadium; when combined with the purple stage lighting, this created the song's signature image.

Prince performed the song as the opening of a medley of his hits with Beyoncé at the 2004 Grammy Awards, and also at the 2006 Brit Awards.

"Purple Rain" ended up being the final song Prince performed live during his final concert in Atlanta, Georgia on April 14, 2016.

As a single
For release as a single, the song was edited down from 8:41 to 4:05.

The B-side, "God", is a much more overtly religious number (Prince's most religious), recalling the Book of Genesis. The song also features extensive vocal experimentation. Towards the end, Prince mentions "The Dance Electric", which was a song given to former band member André Cymone. In the U.K., the 12-inch single also included an instrumental of "God", also known as "Love Theme from "Purple Rain", an edited portion of which appears in the film.

Reception and legacy
In its contemporary review of the single release, Billboard called it a "pretty majestic," saying that "Captured in four minutes, the song and the emotion that make the pivotal moment of a remarkable film."

The song ranked number 18 on the Rolling Stone list of the 500 Greatest Songs of All Time. Q magazine placed it at number 40 in its list of the 100 Greatest Guitar Tracks, and Pitchfork named it the best song of the 1980s. Paste and American Songwriter both ranked it as Prince's greatest song. The song is also included in The Rock and Roll Hall of Fame's 500 Songs that Shaped Rock and Roll.

Personnel
 Prince – lead vocals, lead guitar, backing vocals, other instruments
 Wendy Melvoin – rhythm guitar, backing vocals
 Lisa Coleman – keyboards, backing vocals
 Matt Fink – keyboards
 Brown Mark – bass, backing vocals
 Bobby Z. – drums, percussion
 Novi Novog – violin, viola
 David Coleman – cello
 Suzie Katayama – cello

Track listing

 7-inch single
A. "Purple Rain" (edit) – 4:02 
B. "God" – 3:59

 12-inch single
A. "Purple Rain" – 8:45
B. "God" – 3:59

 12-inch (UK)
A. "Purple Rain" (long version) – 7:05
B1. "God (Love Theme from "Purple Rain")" (instrumental) – 7:54
B2. "God" (vocal) – 3:59

 Shaped picture disc (UK)
A. "Purple Rain" (edit) – 4:02
B. "God" – 3:59

 7-inch promo (US)
A. "Purple Rain" (edit) – 4:02
B. "Purple Rain" (edit) – 4:02

 7-inch promo (UK)A. "Purple Rain" (radio edit) – 4:19
B. "Purple Rain" (long radio edit) – 5:37

 12-inch promo (US)'''
A. "Purple Rain" (edit) – 4:02
B. "Purple Rain" (LP version) – 8:45

Charts

Weekly charts

Year-end charts

Certifications and sales

See also
 Purple Haze

References

1984 singles
Prince (musician) songs
Songs written by Prince (musician)
1980s ballads
Pop ballads
Rock ballads
Cashbox number-one singles
Dutch Top 40 number-one singles
SNEP Top Singles number-one singles
Number-one singles in Finland
Number-one singles in Scotland
Warner Records singles
Song recordings produced by Prince (musician)
1984 songs
Songs written for films
Film theme songs
Gospel songs
Songs about weather
Soul ballads